In earth science, global surface temperature (GST; sometimes referred to as global mean surface temperature, GMST, or global average surface temperature) is calculated by averaging the temperature at the surface of the sea and air temperature over land. In technical writing, scientists call long-term changes in GST global cooling or global warming. Periods of both have happened regularly throughout earth's history.

The reliable measurement of the global temperature started in 1880. Between that year and 1940 the average annual temperature increased by 0.2 °C. The temperature was then stable between 1940 and 1970. Since 1970, it has increased by 0.18 °C each decade. The average global temperature has increased by  compared to the baseline temperature which is about 14 °C. Although a pause has been observed between 1998 and 2013, the global warming continues since at the same pace as before.

Scientists point out that in the earth's 4.6 billion years of history, sea levels have risen and fallen sharply. However, recent global sea level rise rate has deviated from the average rate of the past two to three thousand years, and is rising at a rate of one-tenth of an inch per year. The continuation or acceleration of this trend will cause significant changes in the world's coastlines.

Background 
In the 1860s, physicist John Tyndall recognized the Earth's natural greenhouse effect and suggested that slight changes in the atmospheric composition could bring about climatic variations. In 1896, a seminal paper by Swedish scientist Svante Arrhenius first predicted that changes in the levels of carbon dioxide in the atmosphere could substantially alter the surface temperature through the greenhouse effect.

Changes in global temperatures over the past century provide evidence for the effects of increasing greenhouse gasses. When the climate system reacts to such changes, climate change follows. Measurement of the GST(global surface temperature) is one of the many lines of evidence supporting the scientific consensus on climate change, which is that humans are causing warming of Earth's climate system.

Warming oceans 

With the Earth's temperature increasing, the ocean has absorbed much of this increased heat, with the top 700 meters of ocean showing warming of 0.22 C (0.4 °F) since 1969. Expansion of the warm water, along with melting ice sheets, causes the sea level to rise.

The distribution of excess heat in the ocean is uneven, with the greatest ocean warming occurring in the southern hemisphere and contributing to the underground melting of the Antarctic ice shelf. The warming of sea water is also related to the thinning of ice shelves and sea ice, both of which have a further impact on the Earth's climate system. Finally, sea warming threatens marine ecosystems and human livelihoods. For example, warm water endangers the health of corals, which in turn endangers marine communities that depend on corals for shelter and food. Ultimately, people who rely on marine fisheries for their livelihoods and jobs may face the negative effects of ocean warming.

During the 20th century, the sea surface temperature increased for a century and continued to rise. From 1901 to 2015, the temperature increased by an average of 0.13 °F per decade. Since reliable observations began in 1880, the sea surface temperature has been higher than at any other time in the past three decades. As greenhouse gases absorb more energy from the sun, the ocean absorbs more heat, leading to rising sea surface temperatures and rising sea levels. Changes in ocean temperature and ocean currents brought about by climate change will lead to changes in the global climate pattern. For example, warmer waters may promote the development of stronger storms in the tropics, which may cause property loss and loss of life. Impacts related to sea level rise and severe storms are particularly relevant to coastal communities.

Shrinking ice sheets 
The Antarctic and Greenland ice sheets have decreased exponentially in mass. According to NASA's Gravity Recovery and Climate Experiment, it shows that Greenland has lost an average of 286 billion tons of ice per year.  The expansion of the warm water and the melting ice sheets cause the sea level to rise.

The ice is changing everywhere on earth. Since 1912, the famous snow of Mount Kilimanjaro has melted more than 80%. The glaciers in the Garhwal Himalayas in India are retreating so fast that researchers believe that by 2035, most of the central and eastern Himalayas will actually disappear. For half a century, its range has dropped by about 10% in the past 30 years. NASA repeated laser altimeter readings showed that the edge of the Greenland ice sheet was shrinking. Now, the spring freshwater ice in the northern hemisphere breaks 9 days earlier than 150 years ago, while the autumn freeze is 10 days later. The melting of frozen ground caused land subsidence in parts of Alaska to exceed . From the Arctic to Peru, from Switzerland to the equatorial glacier in Manjaya, Indonesia, massive ice fields, monstrous glaciers, and sea ice are disappearing, fast.

When the temperature rises and the ice melts, more water flows into the ocean from glaciers and ice caps, and the sea water warms and expands in volume.

Greenland's meltwater may greatly affect the flow of huge ocean currents, which are called the Atlantic Meridian Overturning Circulation or AMOC. Similar to a huge conveyor belt, AMOC helps transport hot water from tropical regions to the Arctic. Its important role in the global distribution of heat also makes it have a significant impact on global weather conditions-AMOC's hot water flow is largely due to the mild climate in places such as Western Europe. As fresh water pours into the ocean from the melting Greenland ice sheet, this may slow down the flow of water. At the same time, studies have shown that melting ice from Antarctica may disrupt the structure of the Southern Ocean. Because the density of fresh water is lower than that of salt water, a large amount of melt water may not be able to merge with the rest of the ocean, but form a layer of material attached to the water surface. This cold liquid traps heat underneath it and causes deeper layers to heat up. This increases the overall temperature of the ocean, which makes it less able to absorb  from the atmosphere. As a result, more  will remain in the atmosphere, leading to an increase in global warming.

Greenhouse effects 

The gases that cause the greenhouse effect include:

Water Vapor 
The most abundant greenhouse gas, but importantly, it can serve as a feedback to the climate. As the Earth's atmosphere warms, water vapor will increase, but the possibility of clouds and precipitation will increase, which becomes some of the most important feedback mechanisms for the greenhouse effect.

Carbon Dioxide 
Carbon dioxide is a small but very important component of the atmosphere. It is released through natural processes such as respiration and volcanic eruptions, as well as through human activities such as deforestation, land use changes, and burning of fossil fuels. Since the beginning of the industrial revolution, human atmospheric CO 2 concentration has increased by 47%. This is the most important long-term "forcing" of climate change.

Methane 
Methane is emitted during the production and transportation of coal, natural gas, and oil. Methane emissions also originate from the decay of organic waste from livestock and other agricultural activities and municipal solid waste landfills.

Nitrous Oxide 
Nitrous oxide is 300 times more effective than carbon dioxide, and it also depletes the ozone layer. Since it also has a shorter lifespan, reducing its lifespan may have a more rapid and significant impact on global warming. However, the biggest source of nitrous oxide is agriculture, especially fertilized soil and animal manure, which makes it more difficult to control.

Permafrost is frozen soil that contains ancient soil, sediments, and organic matter of plants and animals. It covers about a quarter of the northern hemisphere. As the Arctic heats up about twice as fast as the rest of the world, the permafrost begins to melt, and ancient materials are also exposed to oxygen, which causes the gases they release to further exacerbate climate warming.

Although the role of nitrous oxide is to deplete the ozone layer, it is not included in the Montreal Protocol on Substances that Deplete the Ozone Layer, an international treaty designed to restore the ozone layer by phasing out certain substances.

Chlorofluorocarbons (CFCs) and Hydrofluorocarbons (HCFCs) 
Synthetic compounds that are entirely industrially sourced can be used in a variety of applications, but due to their ability to help destroy the ozone layer, their production and release into the atmosphere are currently widely regulated by international agreements. While CFC and HCFC destroy ozone, they also trap heat in the lower atmosphere, leading to global warming and changes in climate and weather. HFC, which was originally developed to replace CFC and HCFC, also absorbs and captures infrared radiation or heat in the lower atmosphere of the earth. HFC, CFC and HFC are subsets of a large group of climate change gases called greenhouse gases (GHG). By the end of this century, the addition of greenhouse gases is expected to raise the earth's temperature by 2.5 to 8 degrees Fahrenheit.

Hydrofluorocarbons, CFCs and HFCs are estimated to account for 11.5% of today's greenhouse gas impact on climate and climate change. Some of the effects of global climate change include:

 Sea-level rise
 Extinction of local natural species and loss of habitat
 More frequent heavy rains and floods
 Summer heat
 Increased health threats from insects and water-borne diseases

See also 
 Global temperature record
 Instrumental temperature record

References 

Climate change
Earth sciences